

Regular Football League First team

Number of League games in which this eleven was fielded = 5
 9 September, 3–7 defeat by Derby
 30 September, 7–1 victory over Sunderland
 7 October, 1–2 defeat by Burnley
 14 October 2–2 draw with Blackburn(third consecutive game)
 11 November 1–2 defeat by Derby

Other members of the first team squad

The departure of Alec Stewart to newly promoted Darwen and injury to Fred Geary left Everton needing a new left half and centre forward during the summer of 1893. The two men signed were of the highest calibre in the shape of Billy Stewart who had thrice been a league runner-up with Preston and record £400 signing of Jack Southworth from cash strapped Blackburn. Despite two such high-profile signings Everton's start to the season proved very inconsistent and was a bench mark for the rest of the season in which they would finish only sixth. The full back partnership of Kelso and Howarth was broken up after the first ten games and played together just three more times as six different combinations including Parry, Lindsay and Arridge were tried in a bid to bring stability in front of Richard William's goal. The half back line of Boyle, Holt and Stewart lasted just three games before John Walker was tried in place of Holt after the 3–7 defeat by Derby. Holt was quickly recalled while Kelso, having been moved out of the back line was tried regularly in place of Dickie Boyle at right half in the second half of the season. The expensive signing of Southworth came too late for the first two games of the season in which the forward line, still robbed of Geary started as Latta, Bell, Maxwell, Chadwick and Milward. Alan Maxwell was replaced at centre forward by Alf Milward for the second game with James McMillan coming into the reshuffled front rank before Southworth made the slot his own in the third game with John Bell deputising for three games and Fred Geary, now back from injury stepping in for three. Geary was restricted to just nine appearances all season in every position of the front rank while Maxwell was also unable to get into the side, moving to newly promoted Darwen where his goals were unable to stave off relegation.

The Football League

First Division

Football Association Challenge Cup

League club records set this season
 Most points won at home in a season (23)
 Most home victories in a season (11)
 Equalled most away drawn games in a season (2)
 Most goals scored in a season (90)
 Most goals scored at home in a season (63)
 Most individual goals in a single game (6 by Jack Southworth vs West Bromwich Albion, 30 December 1893)
 Most hat-tricks in a season by the team (4 – includes Southworth's six as a double hat-trick)
 Most individual hat-tricks in a season (3 – Jack Southworth, double hat-trick is counted as two hat-tricks)
 Record scorer for a single season (Jack Southworth; 27)
 Equalled longest sequence of away draws in a season twice (1)

Negative records
 Most defeats in a season (12)
 Equalled most home defeats in a season (3)
 Most away defeats in a season (9)
 Most goals conceded at home in a season (23)
 Equalled most goals conceded away from home in a season (34)
 Heaviest defeat (3–7 at Derby County; 7 September 1893)
 Second consecutive season with no ever present players
 Equalled longest sequence of consecutive defeats (4)
 Equalled longest sequence of consecutive home defeats (2)
 Longest sequence of consecutive away defeats (4)
 Equalled longest winless away sequence in a season twice (4)

References

1893-94
English football clubs 1893–94 season